Gypsy O'Brien (1889–1975) was a theater and film actress. Her theater performances included a role in Cheating Cheaters. She also appeared in Bunny at the Hudson Theatre. Her performance as the persecuted heroine was described as pretty and spirited. According to marketing materials she had titian hair. Her film debut was in The Soul Market in 1916. She portrayed an investigative reporter in Nothing But Lies.

Filmography 
The Scarlet Runner (1916), a serial starring with Earle Williams
The Soul Market (1916)
Wanted: A Husband (1919)

Nothing but Lies (1920) directed by Lawrence C. Windom
The Master Mind (1920) with Lionel Barrymore
Salvation Nell (1921)
The Young Diana (1922)
The Broken Silence (1922)
 Sinner or Saint (1923)
Little Old New York (1923)

References

External links 

 
 

20th-century American actresses
1889 births
1975 deaths